Major Lord Bernard Charles Gordon-Lennox (1 May 1878 – 10 November 1914), was a British Army officer.

Gordon-Lennox was the third son of Charles Gordon-Lennox, 7th Duke of Richmond, by his first wife Amy Mary, daughter of Percy Ricardo, of Bramley Park, Guildford, Surrey. Charles Gordon-Lennox, 8th Duke of Richmond and Brigadier-General Lord Esmé Gordon-Lennox were his elder brothers. He was educated at Eton and the Royal Military College, Sandhurst. He was a major in the Grenadier Guards and served in the Second Boer War, in China, and in World War I, where he was killed in action in November 1914, aged 36.  He was buried in Zillebeke Churchyard Commonwealth War Graves Commission Cemetery.  

Gordon-Lennox appeared in a single first-class cricket match for Middlesex against Gloucestershire in the 1903 County Championship.

Gordon-Lennox married Evelyn, daughter of Henry Loch, 1st Baron Loch, in 1907. They had two sons, Lieutenant-General Sir George Gordon-Lennox and Rear-Admiral Sir Alexander Gordon-Lennox. Lady Bernard Gordon-Lennox remained a widow until her death in June 1944, during World War II, aged 67, when a V-1 flying bomb hit the Guards Chapel, Wellington Barracks.

Memorial windows
There is are stained-glass windows dedicated to him at the Gordon Chapel in Scotland and Boxgrove Priory church, West Sussex.

References

1878 births
1914 deaths
Burials in Belgium
Younger sons of dukes
People educated at Eton College
Grenadier Guards officers
English cricketers
Middlesex cricketers
Graduates of the Royal Military College, Sandhurst
British military personnel killed in World War I
British Army personnel of World War I